Note: Names that cannot be confirmed in Wikipedia database nor through given sources are subject to removal. If you would like to add a new name please consider writing about the artist first.

''This is an alphabetical listing of Polish painters. This list is incomplete. If a notable Polish painter is missing and without article, please add the name here.

A
 Bronislaw Abramowicz (1837–1912)
 Piotr Abraszewski (1905–1996)
 Julia Acker (1898–1942)
 Tadeusz Ajdukiewicz (1852–1916)
 Zygmunt Ajdukiewicz (1861–1917)
 Hiacynt Alchimowicz (1841–after 1897)
 Kazimierz Alchimowicz (1840–1916)
 Zygmunt Andrychiewicz (1861–1943)
 Włodzimierz Antkowiak (born 1946)
 Zofia Atteslander (1874–c. 1928)
 Aleksander Augustynowicz (1865–1944)
 Teodor Axentowicz (1859–1938)

B
 Władysław Bakałowicz (1831–1904)
 Stefan Bakałowicz (1857–1947)
 Henoch Barczyński (1896–1941)
 Andrzej Marian Bartczak (born 1945)
 Zdzisław Beksiński (1929–2005)
 Ludomir Benedyktowicz (1844–1926)
 Stanisław Bergman (1862–1930)
 Jan Betley (1908–1980)
 Anna Bilińska (1857–1893)
 Antoni Blank (1785–1844)
 Jan Bohuszewicz (1878–1935)
 Krzysztof Boguszewski (died 1635)
 Stanisław Bohusz-Siestrzeńcewicz (1869–1927)
 Olga Boznańska (1865–1940)
 Józef Brandt (1841–1915)
 Chrystian Breslauer (1802–1882)
 Antoni Brodowski (1784–1832)
 Józef Brodowski the Elder (c. 1775/81–1853)
 Józef Brodowski the Younger (1828–1900)
 Tadeusz Brodowski (1821–1848)
 Feliks Brzozowski (1836–1892)
 Tadeusz Brzozowski (1918–1987)
 Teodor Buchholz (1857–1942)
 Maxim Bugzester (1909–1978)

C
 Józef Cempla (1918–2004)
 Maximilian Cercha (1818–1907)
 Józef Chełmoński (1849–1905)
 Stanisław Chlebowski (1835–1884)
 Daniel Chodowiecki (1726–1801)
 Leon Chwistek (1884–1944)
 Jan Ciągliński (1858–1913)
 Henryk Cieszkowski (1835–1895)
 Florian Cynk (1838–1912)
 Władysław Czachorski (1850–1911)
 Józef Czajkowski (1872–1947)
 Marian Czapla (1946–2016)
 Szymon Czechowicz (1689–1775)
 Tytus Czyżewski (1880–1945)

Ć
 Zefiryn Ćwikliński (1871–1930)

D
 Odo Dobrowolski (1883–1917)
 Tomasz Dolabella (1570–1650)
 Kasia Domanska (born 1972)
 Tadeusz Dominik (1928–2014)
 Tadeusz Dowgird (1852–1919)

E
 Erwin Elster (1887–1977)
 Stasys Eidrigevicius (born 1949)

F
 Erazm Fabijański (1826–1892)
 Julian Fałat (1853–1929)
 Wojciech Fangor (1922–2015)
 Stefan Filipkiewicz (1879–1944)
 Stanisław Frenkiel (1918–2001)
 Tadeusz Fuss-Kaden (1914–1985)

G
 Ewa Gargulinska (born 1941)
 Maria Gażycz (1860–1935)
 Ignacy Gepner (1802–1867)
 Wojciech Gerson (1831–1901)
 Adam Gerżabek (1898–1965)
 Stefan Gierowski (1925–2022)
 Aleksander Gierymski (1850–1901)
 Maksymilian Gierymski (1846–1874)
 Adrian Głębocki (1833–1905)
 Krzysztof Gliszczyński (born 1962)
 Izabella Godlewska (1931–2018)
 Chaim Goldberg (1917–2004)
 Tadeusz Gorecki (1825–1868)
 Michał Gorstkin-Wywiórski (1861–1926)
 Henryk Gotlib (1890–1966)
 Maurycy Gottlieb (1856–1879)
 Stanisław Grocholski (1865–1932)
 Artur Grottger (1837–1867)
 Aleksander Gryglewski (1833–1879)
 Gustaw Gwozdecki (1880–1935)

H
 Karol Hiller (1891–1939)

I
 Napoleon Iłłakowicz (1811–1861)
 Marian Iwańciów (1906–1971)

J
 Izydor Jabłoński (1865–1905)
 Janusz Janowski (born 1965)
 Maria Jarema (1908–1958)
 Zdzisław Jasiński (1863–1932)
 Renata Jaworska (born 1979)
 Danuta Joppek (born 1955)
 Krzysztof Jung (1951–1998)
 Ewa Juszkiewicz (born 1984)

K 
 Jan Kaja (born 1957)
 Stanisław Kamocki (1875–1944)
 Rajmund Kanelba (1897–1960)
 Tadeusz Kantor (1915–1990)
 Stanisława de Karłowska (1876–1952)
 Alfons Karpiński (1875–1961)
 Katarzyna Karpowicz (born 1985)
 Wincenty Kasprzycki (1802–1849)
 Apoloniusz Kędzierski (1861–1939)
 Mojżesz Kisling (1891–1953)
 Marcin Kitz (1891–1943)
 Marcin Kober (c. 1550–c. 1598)
 Roman Kochanowski (1857–1945)
 Aleksander Kokular (1793–1846)
 Ludwik Konarzewski (1885–1954)
 Ludwik Konarzewski (junior) (1918–1989)
 Bogdan Korczowski (born 1954)
 Jerzy Kossak (1886–1955)
 Juliusz Kossak (1824–1899)
 Wojciech Kossak (1856–1942)
 Franciszek Kostrzewski (1826–1911)
 Mieczysław Kościelniak (1912–1993)
 Wilhelm Kotarbiński (1848–1921)
 Apolinary Kotowicz (1859–1917)
 Aleksander Kotsis (1836–1877)
 Alfred Kowalski (1849–1915)
 Andrzej Kowalski (1930–2004)
 Felicjan Kowarski (1890–1948)
 Antoni Kozakiewicz (1841–1929)
 Andrzej Krajewski (1933–2018)
 Nikifor Krynicki (1895–1968)
 Hilary Krzysztofiak (1926–1979)
 Konrad Krzyżanowski (1872–1922)
 Wlodzimierz Ksiazek (1951–2011) 
 Stanisław Kubicki (1889–1943)
 Alexander Kucharsky (1741–1819)
 Jarosław Kukowski (born 1972)
 Teofil Kwiatkowski (1809–1891)

L
 Tamara de Lempicka (1898–1980)
 Stanisław Lentz (1861–1920)
 Wincenty de Lesseur (1745–1813)
 Olga Lewicka (born 1975)
 Benon Liberski (1926–1983)

Ł
 Władysław Łuszczkiewicz (1828–1900)
Bronisława Łukaszewicz (1885–1962)

M
 Jerzy Makarewicz (1907–1944)
 Tadeusz Makowski (1882–1932)
 Jacek Malczewski (1854–1929)
 Władysław Malecki (1836–1900)
 Geno Malkowski (1942–2016)
 Adam Marczyński (1908–1985)
 Artur Markowicz (1872–1934) 
 Ludwik Marteau (c.1715–1804)
 Stanisław Masłowski (1853–1926)
 Jan Matejko (1838–1893)
 Józef Męcina-Krzesz (1860–1934)
 Józef Mehoffer (1869–1946)
 Paweł Merwart (1855–1902)
 Piotr Michałowski (1800–1855)
 Jacek Mierzejewski (1883–1925)
 Jerzy Mierzejewski (1917–2012)
 Maurycy Minkowski (1881–1930)
 Augustyn Mirys (1700–1790)
 Ludwik Misky (1884–1938)
 Eugeniusz Molski (born 1942)
 Tadeusz Myslowski (born 1943)

N
 Abraham Neumann (1873–1942)
 Leopold Niemirowski (1810–1883)
 Eligiusz Niewiadomski (1869–1923)
 Jan Piotr Norblin (1745–1830)
 Zbigniew Nowosadzki (born 1957)
 Jerzy Nowosielski (1923–2011)
 Leszek Nowosielski (1918–2000)

O
 Seweryn Obst (1847–1917)
 Józef Oleszkiewicz (c. 1777–1830)
 Roman Opałka (1931–2011)
 Aleksander Orłowski (1777–1832)

P
 Aniela Pająkówna (1864–1912)
 Józef Pankiewicz (1866–1940)
 Aniela Pawlikowska (1901–1980)
 Józef Peszka (1767–1831)
 Franciszek Pfanhauser (1796–1865)
 Henryk Pillati (1832–1894)
 Józef Pitschmann (1758–1834)
 Kazimierz Pochwalski (1855–1940)
 Władysław Pochwalski (1860–1924)
 Władysław Podkowiński (1866–1895)
 Tadeusz Popiel (1863–1913)
 Peter Potworowski (1898–1962)
 Thomas Pradzynski (1951–2007)
 Tadeusz Pruszkowski (1888–1942)
 Witold Pruszkowski (1846–1896)
 Stanislaw Przespolewski (1910–1989)

R
 Józef Rapacki (1871–1929)
 Jan Rembowski (1879–1923)
 Henryk Rodakowski (1823–1894)
 Jan Rosen (1854–1936)
 Marcin Rożek (1885–1944)
 Jan Rubczak (1882–1942)
 Hanna Rudzka-Cybisowa (1897–1988)
 Kanuty Rusiecki (1800–1860) 
 Ferdynand Ruszczyc (1870–1936)

S
 Wojciech Sadley (born 1932)
 Katrina Sadrak (born 1978)
 Stanisław Samostrzelnik (c. 1490–1541)
 Wilhelm Sasnal (born 1972)
 Bruno Schulz (1892–1942)
 Kazimierz Sichulski (1879–1942)
 Jerzy Siemiginowski-Eleuter (c. 1660–c. 1711)
 Henryk Siemiradzki (1843–1902)
 Józef Simmler (1823–1868)
 Wojciech Siudmak (born  1942)
 Wincenty Sleńdziński (1838–1909)
 Władysław Ślewiński (1856–1918)
 Wincenty Smokowski (1797–1876)
 Franciszek Smuglewicz (1745–1807)
 Jacek Soliński (born 1957)
 Kajetan Sosnowski (1913–1987)
 Jan Stanisławski (1860–1907)
 Franciszek Starowieyski (1930–2009)
 Kazimierz Stabrowski (1869–1929)
 Piotr Stachiewicz (1858–1938)
 Michał Stachowicz (1768–1825)
 Ludwik Stasiak (1858–1924)
 Henryk Stażewski (1894–1988)
 Andrzej Stech (1635–1697)
 Kajetan Stefanowicz (1886–1920)
 Zofia Stryjeńska (1891–1976)
 Władysław Strzemiński (1893–1952)
 Jan Styka (1858–1925)
 January Suchodolski (1797–1875)
 Józef Szermentowski (1833–1876)
 Stanislav Szukalski (1893–1987)
 Boguslaw Szwacz (1912–2009)
 Włodzimierz Szymanowicz (1946–1967)
 Pantaleon Szyndler (1846–1905)

T
 Franciszek Tepa (1829–1889)
 Włodzimierz Tetmajer (1861–1923)
 Stanisław Tondos (1854–1917)
 Wincenty Trojanowski (1859–1928)

U
 Aleksandra Urban (born 1978)

V
 Zygmunt Vogel (1764–1826)

W
 Zygmunt Waliszewski (1897–1936)
 Władysław Wankie (1860–1925)
 Walenty Wańkowicz  (1799–1842)
 Ryszard Wasko (born 1947)
 Wacław Wąsowicz (1891–1942)
 Wojciech Weiss (1875–1950)
 Henryk Weyssenhoff (1859–1922)
 Katerina Wilczynski  (1894–1978)
 Mikołaj Wisznicki (1870–1954)
 Stanisław Witkiewicz (1851–1915)
 Stanisław Ignacy Witkiewicz (1885–1939)
 Karol D. Witkowski (1860–1910)
 Wincenty Wodzinowski (1866–1940)
 Kazimierz Wojniakowski (1771–1812)
 Witold Wojtkiewicz (1879–1909)
 Ryszard Woźniak (born 1956)
 Andrzej Wróblewski (1927–1957)
 Leon Wyczółkowski (1852–1936)
 Stanisław Wyspiański (1869–1907)

Y
 Jacek Yerka (born 1952)

Z
 Eugeniusz Zak (1884–1926)
 Marcin Zaleski (1796–1877)
 Jan Zamoyski (1542–1605)
 Anna Ziaja (born 1954)

Ż
 Franciszek Żmurko (1859–1910)
 Aleksander Żywiecki (born 1962)

See also
 List of famous Poles
 List of painters
 List of Polish graphic designers
 List of Polish sculptors

 
Polish painters
Painters